The following outline is provided as an overview of and topical guide to Cape Town:

Cape Town – capital city of the Western Cape province and legislative capital of South Africa.

General reference 
 Pronunciation: (Xhosa: iKapa; Dutch: Kaapstad);
 Common English name(s): Cape Town
 Official English name(s): Cape Town
 Adjectival(s): Capetonian
 Demonym(s): Capetonian

Geography 
 
Geography of Cape Town
 Cape Town is:
 a city
 capital of Western Cape
 Population of Cape Town: 433,688 
 Area of Cape Town: 400.28 km2 (154.55 sq mi)

Location 

 Cape Town is situated within the following regions:
 Southern Hemisphere and Eastern Hemisphere
 Afro-Eurasia
 Africa (outline) 
 Southern Africa
 South Africa (outline)
 Western Cape
 City of Cape Town
 Time zone(s): 
 South African Standard Time (UTC+02)

Environment 

 Biodiversity of Cape Town
 Climate of Cape Town
 Nature reserves in Cape Town
 Table Mountain National Park
 Water crisis in Cape Town

Natural geographic features 

 Bays 

 Camps Bay
 False Bay
 Gordon's Bay

 Hout Bay
 Simon's Bay

 Table Bay
 Beaches of Cape Town
 Hills 

 Signal Hill

 Mountains 
 Devil's Peak
 Lion's Head
 Table Mountain
 Islands 
 Robben Island
 Rivers 

 Eerste River

 Salt River
 Black River
 Elsieskraal River
 Liesbeek River

Regions 

 Atlantic Seaboard
 Cape Flats
 City Bowl
 Helderberg
 Northern Suburbs
 Southern Suburbs
 South Peninsula

Suburbs 
Suburbs of Cape Town

 Athlone
 Bakoven
 Bantry Bay
 Belhar
 Bellville
 Bergvliet
 Bishop Lavis
 Bishopscourt
 Bloubergstrand
 Blue Downs
 Bo-Kaap
 Bonteheuwel
 Bothasig
 Brackenfell
 Brooklyn
 Camps Bay
 Capri Village
 Century City
 Claremont
 Clifton
 Clovelly
 Constantia
 Crawford
 Da Gama Park
 Delft
 Devil's Peak Estate
 Diep River
 Durbanville
 Edgemead
 Eerste River
 Elsie's River
 Epping
 Faure
 Fish Hoek
 Fresnaye
 Gardens
 Glencairn
 Goodwood
 Grassy Park
 Green Point
 Gugulethu
 Hanover Park
 Harfield Village
 Heathfield
 Higgovale
 Hout Bay
 Imizamo Yethu
 Kalk Bay
 Kenilworth
 Kensington
 Kenwyn
 Khayelitsha
 Kommetjie
 Kraaifontein
 Kuils River
 Langa
 Lansdowne
 Lavender Hill
 Llandudno
 Lotus River
 Lwandle
 Macassar
 Maitland
 Manenberg
 Masiphumelele
 Meadowridge
 Melkbosstrand
 Milnerton
 Mitchells Plain
 Monte Vista
 Mouille Point
 Mowbray
 Muizenberg
 Ndabeni
 Newlands
 Noordhoek
 Nyanga
 Observatory
 Ocean View
 Ottery
 Oranjezicht
 Panorama
 Parklands
 Parow
 Philippi
 Pinelands
 Plumstead
 Retreat
 Richwood
 Rondebosch
 Rondebosch East
 Rosebank
 Salt River
 Scarborough
 Schotsche Kloof
 Sea Point
 Simon's Town
 St James
 Steenberg
 Strandfontein
 Table View
 Tamboerskloof
 Thornton
 Three Anchor Bay
 Tokai
 University Estate
 Vredehoek
 Walmer Estate
 Wetton
 Woodstock
 Wynberg
 Zonnebloem

Neighbourhoods 

 De Waterkant
 Victoria & Alfred Waterfront

Places of interest

Bridges 
 Foreshore Freeway Bridge

Cultural and exhibition centres 

 Cape Town International Convention Centre
 Good Hope Centre

Fortifications 

Fortifications of the Cape Peninsula
 Castle of Good Hope
 Chavonnes Battery
 Fort de Goede Hoop

Monuments and memorials 

 Artillery Memorial, Cape Town
 Japanese Lantern Monument
 Rhodes Memorial
 The Cenotaph
 Treaty Tree

Museums and art galleries 

Museums in Cape Town
 Cape Town Science Centre
 District Six Museum
 Groot Constantia
 Groote Schuur
 Heart of Cape Town Museum
 Iziko South African Museum
 Iziko South African National Gallery
 Koopmans-de Wet House
 Slave Lodge
 South African Sendinggestig Museum
 Waterworks Museum
 Zeitz Museum of Contemporary Art Africa

Parks and gardens 

 Arderne Gardens
 Company's Garden
 De Waal Park
 Green Point Common
 Helderberg Nature Reserve
 Keurboom Park
 Kirstenbosch National Botanical Garden
 Rondebosch Common
 Rondebosch Park
 Tokai Arboretum
 Tokai Park
 Wynberg Park

Public squares 

 Grand Parade
 Greenmarket Square

Religious buildings 

 Auwal Mosque
 Gardens Shul
 Groote Kerk
 Lutheran Church in Strand Street
 Palm Tree Mosque
 Queen Victoria mosque
 St. George's Cathedral
 St. James Church
 St. Mary's Cathedral

Secular buildings 
 Atterbury House
 Cape Town City Hall
 Cape Town Civic Centre
 Centre for the Book
 Coornhoop
 Disa Park
 Genadendal Residence
 Hawthorndon House
 Houses of Parliament
 Huguenot Memorial Building
 Leeuwenhof
 Metlife Centre
 Mutual Building
 Naspers Centre
 Portside Tower
 Royal Observatory, Cape of Good Hope
 Triangle House

Shopping areas, malls and markets 
 Canal Walk

 Somerset Mall
 Victoria & Alfred Waterfront

Streets 

 Adderley Street
 Long Street
 Strand Street

Theatres 

 Baxter Theatre Centre
 Labia Theatre
 Space Theatre
 The Independent Armchair Theatre

Triangulation station 
 Maclear's Beacon

World Heritage Sites 
Cape Floristic Region
Table Mountain National Park
Robben Island

Demographics 

Demographics of Cape Town

Government and politics 

Politics of Cape Town
 Parliament of South Africa
 Houses of Parliament
 Mayor of Cape Town
 Deputy Mayor of Cape Town
 International relations of Cape Town
 Twin towns and sister cities of Cape Town

Law and justice 

 Law enforcement in Cape Town
 Municipal Police

History 
 History of Cape Town
 Invasion of the Cape Colony
 Battle of Blaauwberg
 Anglo-Dutch Treaty of 1814
 Noon Gun
 Timeline of Cape Town

Culture

Arts

Architecture  
Architecture of Cape Town
 Cape Dutch architecture
 Buildings in Cape Town
 Tallest buildings in Cape Town

Music and dance 

 Ballet of Cape Town
 Cape Town City Ballet
 Music festivals and competitions in Cairo
 Cape Town International Jazz Festival
 Music schools in Cape Town
 Hugo Lambrechts Music Centre
 South African College of Music
 Music venues in Cape Town
 Artscape Theatre Centre
 Musical ensembles in Cape Town
 Cape Town Opera
 Cape Town Philharmonia Choir
 Cape Town Philharmonic Orchestra
 Musicians from Cape Town
 Michael Blake
 Victor Hely-Hutchinson
 John Joubert

Theatre 

 Magnet Theatre

Visual arts 

 Cape Town in art
 Public art in Cape Town
 Statue of Nelson Mandela, Cape Town City Hall

Cuisine 
 Cape Town wine
 Constantia (wine)
 Gatsby (sandwich)

Events 
 Cape Town Book Fair
 South African International Exhibition

Festivals 
 Kaapse Klopse

Languages 
 Afrikaans
 South African English
 Xhosa

Media 
 Newspapers
Cape Times
The Cape Messenger
 Radio and television
 CapeTalk
 Cape Town TV
 Fine Music Radio

People from Cape Town 
 Zach de Beer
 J. M. Coetzee
 Derek Hanekom

Religion 
 Anglican Diocese of Cape Town
 Roman Catholic Archdiocese of Cape Town

Sports 

Sports in Cape Town
 Football
 Association football
 Ajax Cape Town F.C.
 Cape Town City F.C.)
 Cape Town All Stars
 Rugby football
 Western Province
 Cricket in Cape Town
 Cape Cobras
 Sports events in Cape Town
 2010 FIFA World Cup
 Cape Town Cycle Tour
 Cape Town Open
 Cape Town Marathon
 Table Mountain Challenge
 Two Oceans Marathon
 Sports venues in Cape Town
 Cape Town Stadium
 Green Point Stadium
 Killarney Motor Racing Complex
 Milnerton Racecourse
 Newlands Cricket Ground
 Newlands Stadium

Economy and infrastructure 

Economy of Cape Town
 Companies in Cape Town
 Naspers 
 Travelstart
 Communications in Cape Town
 MWEB
 Entrepreneurship and innovation
 Silicon Cape Initiative
 Financial services in Cape Town
 Sanlam
 Hotels and resorts in Cape Town
 Belmond Mount Nelson Hotel
 Protea Hotels by Marriott
 Restaurants and cafés in Cape Town
 Café Caprice
 Top of the Ritz (revolving restaurant)
 Shopping malls and markets in Cape Town
 Canal Walk
 Somerset Mall
 Tourism in Cape Town
 Tourist attractions in Cape Town
Beaches of Cape Town
Cape of Good Hope
Groot Constantia
Nature reserves in Cape Town

Transportation 

Transport in Cape Town
 Air transport in Cape Town
 Airports in Cape Town 
 Cape Town International Airport
 Cable transport in Cape Town
 Table Mountain Aerial Cableway
 Maritime transport in Cape Town
 Port of Cape Town
 Road transport in Cape Town
 Buses in Cape Town
Golden Arrow Bus Services
MyCiTi
 Roads in Cape Town
Peninsula Expressway
R300
 Trolleybuses in Cape Town
 Trolleybuses in Cape Town

Rail transport 

Rail transport in Cape Town
 Blue Train
 Commuter rail lines
 Metrorail Western Cape
 Cape Flats Line
 Central Line
 Northern Line
 Southern Line
 Railway stations in Cape Town
 Cape Town railway station
 Trams in Cape Town

Education 

Education in Cape Town
 Libraries in Cape Town
 Central Library Cape Town
 University of Cape Town Libraries
 Universities and colleges in Cape Town
 Cape Peninsula University of Technology
 University of Cape Town
 University of the Western Cape
 Schools in Cape Town 
 Cape Town High School

Healthcare 

Healthcare in Cape Town
 Hospitals in Cape Town
 Alexandra Hospital
 Groote Schuur Hospital
 Karl Bremer Hospital
 Red Cross War Memorial Children's Hospital
 Somerset Hospital
 Tygerberg Hospital
 Valkenberg Hospital

See also 

 Outline of geography

References

External links 

Cape Town
Cape Town